Shira (Hebrew:  שירה) is a Hebrew feminine given name meaning "poetry", "singing" or "music".   It was the second most popular name given to girls born in Israel in 2012.

Shira Arad
Shira Geffen
Shira Haas
Shira Kammen
Shira Lazar
Shira Naor
Shira Nayman
Shira Piven
Shira Rishony (born 1991), Israeli Olympic judoka
Shira Scheindlin
Shira Tarrant
Shira Willner

See also
 Shir (disambiguation)
 Shiri (disambiguation)

Notes

Hebrew feminine given names